HMS Rawalpindi was a British armed merchant cruiser, (a converted ocean liner employed as a convoy escort, as a patrol vessel, or to enforce a blockade) that was sunk in a surface action against the German battleships  and  during the first months of the Second World War. Her captain was Edward Coverley Kennedy.

Service history

Merchant service
The ship started life as the  Peninsular and Oriental Steam Navigation Company (P&O) ocean liner Rawalpindi, built by Harland and Wolff. She was launched on 26 March 1925 by Lady Birkenhead, the wife of F. E. Smith, 1st Earl of Birkenhead, and joined the P&O fleet in September of the same year. She was named after the city of Rawalpindi, a British garrison town in what is now Pakistan. She had berths for 307 First Class and 288 Second Class passengers, and was employed on the London to Bombay service.

Naval service
The Admiralty requisitioned Rawalpindi on 26 August 1939 and had her converted into an armed merchant cruiser by the addition of eight elderly 6 in (150 mm) guns and two 3 in (76 mm) guns. She was set to work from October 1939 in the Northern Patrol covering the area around Iceland. On 19 October in the Denmark Strait, Rawalpindi intercepted the German tanker Gonzenheim (4,574 grt), which had left Buenos Aires on 14 September. The tanker was scuttled by her crew before a boarding party could get on board.

Sinking
Whilst patrolling north of the Faroe Islands on 23 November 1939, she investigated a possible enemy sighting, only to find that she had encountered two powerful German warships, the battleships Scharnhorst and Gneisenau, which had been conducting a sweep between Iceland and the Faroes. Rawalpindi was able to signal the German ships' location back to base. Despite being hopelessly outgunned, 60-year-old Captain Edward Coverley Kennedy RN of Rawalpindi decided to fight, rather than surrender as demanded by the Germans. He was heard to say "We'll fight them both, they'll sink us, and that will be that. Good-bye".

The German warships sank Rawalpindi within 40 minutes. She managed to score one hit on Scharnhorst, which caused minor splinter damage. 238 men died on Rawalpindi, including Captain Kennedy. Thirty-seven men were rescued by the German ships, a further 11 were picked up by HMS Chitral (another converted passenger ship). Captain Kennedy—the father of naval officer, broadcaster and author Ludovic Kennedy—was posthumously Mentioned in Dispatches. Crew members on Scharnhorst and Gneisenau were eligible for the High Seas Fleet Badge for participating in the sinking of Rawalpindi.

Sister ships
Rawalpindi was one of the P&O 'R' class liners from 1925 that had had much of their interiors designed by Lord Inchcape's daughter Elsie Mackay.

References

Bibliography

External links
 
 
 
 
  – The role of HMS Jervis Bay in the fate of Rawalpindi

 

Ocean liners
Ocean liners of the United Kingdom
Steamships
Steamships of the United Kingdom
World War II passenger ships of the United Kingdom
World War II Auxiliary cruisers of the Royal Navy
World War II cruisers of the United Kingdom
World War II shipwrecks in the Atlantic Ocean
1925 ships
Maritime incidents in November 1939
Ships built by Harland and Wolff
Ships built on the River Clyde